Events from the year 1788 in Scotland.

Incumbents

Law officers 
 Lord Advocate – Ilay Campbell
 Solicitor General for Scotland – Robert Dundas of Arniston

Judiciary 
 Lord President of the Court of Session – Lord Glenlee
 Lord Justice General – The Viscount Stormont
 Lord Justice Clerk – Lord Braxfield

Events 
 31 January – Henry Benedict Stuart becomes the new Stuart claimant to the throne of Great Britain as King Henry IX and the figurehead of Jacobitism.
 14 March – the Edinburgh Evening Courant carries a notice of £200 reward for capture of William Brodie, town councillor doubling as a burglar.
 27 August – trial of William Brodie begins in Edinburgh. He is sentenced to death by hanging.
 1 October – William Brodie hanged at the Tolbooth in Edinburgh.
 14 October – William Symington demonstrates a paddle steamer on Dalswinton Loch near Dumfries.
 Tobermory, Mull, and Ullapool are founded as herring ports by the British Fisheries Society to the designs of Thomas Telford.
 Flax mills established at Brigton in Angus and Inverbervie in Kincardineshire.
 Lowland Licence Act restricts exports of Scottish gin to England, effectively requiring a one-year pause in the trade.
 St Gregory's Church, Preshome, designed by Father John Reid, is built.
 Ring of bells cast for the new steeple of St Andrew's Church in New Town, Edinburgh, the oldest complete ring in Scotland.
 General Register House in Edinburgh, designed by Robert Adam and begun in 1774, is opened to the public.
 The estate house at Yair is built.
 Encyclopædia Britannica Third Edition begins publication in Edinburgh.

Births 
 31 January – John Ewart, architect and businessman in North America (died 1856 in Canada)
 April – George Ferguson, naval officer (died 1867 in London)
 15 May – Neil Arnott, physician (died 1874 in London)
 29 August – Ranald George Macdonald, clan chief and politician (died 1873 in London)
 2 September – John Strange, merchant and politician in Canada (died 1840 in Canada)
 13 October – Thomas Erskine, lawyer and revisionary Calvinist theologian (died 1870)
 11 November – Thomas Francis Kennedy, lawyer and politician (died 1879)
 31 December – Basil Hall, naval officer and explorer (died 1844 in Portsmouth)
 David Lennox, builder of stone bridges in Australia (died 1873 in Australia)
 Charles Mackenzie, diplomat and journalist (died 1862 in the United States)
 George Mudie, social reformer
 James Thompson, Baptist pastor and educator in South America (died 1854 in London)

Deaths 
 31 January – Charles Edward Stuart, claimant to the British throne (born 1720, and died, in Italy)
 14 June – Adam Gib, Secession Church leader (born 1714)
 15 October – Samuel Greig, admiral in the Imperial Russian Navy (born 1736; died in Tallinn)

The arts
 December – Robert Burns writes his version of the Scots poem Auld Lang Syne. From Whitsun he has been tenant of Ellisland Farm.
 William Collins publishes Ode on the Popular Superstitions of the Highlands of Scotland.

See also 

Timeline of Scottish history
 1788 in Great Britain

References 

 
Years of the 18th century in Scotland
Scotland
1780s in Scotland